Living Dub is a dub album by the Jamaican artist Burning Spear, his third overall and second under the name "Living Dub".

Track listing
Cry Africa (Cry Blood Africans)
Telegram In Dub (African Postman)
Teacher (African Teacher)
Offensive Dub (Jah A Guh Raid)
Majestic Dub (Hail H.I.M.)
Pirate's Dub (Columbus)
Foggy (Road Foggy)
Marcus Dub (Follow Marcus Garvey)
World Dub (Bad To Worst)
Over All Dub (Civilized Reggae)

Credits
All songs written and arranged by Winston Rodney
Published by Burning Music
Recorded at Tuff Gong Recording Studio, Kingston Jamaica
Engineered by Dennis Thompson and Errol Brown
Remixed in November 1992 at Grove Recording Studio, Ocho Rios, Jamaica by Barry O'Hare and Nelson Miller
Reissue supervision: Chris Wilson
Original artwork and photography by Neville Garrick

Personnel
Winston Rodney - vocals, percussion, congos
Aston "Family Man" Barrett - bass, percussion
Nelson Miller - drums
Junior Marvin - guitar
Tyrone "Organ D" Downie - keyboards
Earl "Wire" Lindo - keyboards
Herman Marquis – alto saxophone
Bobby Ellis - trumpet
Egbert Evans - trombone

Burning Spear albums
1980 albums
Dub albums